Damon Wayne Mashore (born October 31, 1969) is a former professional baseball player who played three seasons for the Oakland Athletics and Anaheim Angels of Major League Baseball. He is currently the first base coach for the Los Angeles Angels.

Career
Mashore was born in Puerto Rico in 1969 where his mother was visiting his father, Clyde, while he was playing in the Liga de Béisbol Profesional de Puerto Rico. He turned down scholarship offers to play both college football and college baseball for the Miami Hurricanes.

He played collegiately for the University of Arizona from 1989 to 1991 where he earned Second Team All-America honors from Baseball America in 1991 and third-team laurels the same season from Collegiate Baseball Newspaper.

His father played in the majors from 1969 to 1973, mostly for the Montreal Expos. His brother Justin Mashore is a former assistant hitting coach for the Texas Rangers.

Clyde and Damon Mashore each finished their career with 8 home runs.  At the time, this was a record for the most career home runs by a father and son who hit exactly the same number.  The record was broken in 2016 by Cecil Fielder and Prince Fielder, who each hit 319 home runs.

See also
 List of Major League Baseball players from Puerto Rico

References

External links

1969 births
Living people
Arizona League Athletics players
California Angels players
Chico Heat players
Edmonton Trappers players
El Paso Diablos players
Fresno Grizzlies players
Huntsville Stars players
Lancaster JetHawks players
Major League Baseball outfielders
Major League Baseball players from Puerto Rico
Memphis Redbirds players
Minor league baseball coaches
Modesto A's players
Oakland Athletics players
Puerto Rican expatriate baseball players in Canada
Southern Oregon A's players
Tucson Sidewinders players
Vancouver Canadians players
Yuma Bullfrogs players
Arizona Wildcats baseball players
Anchorage Glacier Pilots players